Laysky Dok is a rural locality (a settlement) in Primorsky District, Arkhangelsk Oblast, Russia. The population was 728 as of 2010. There are 6 streets.

Geography 
Laysky Dok is located on the Laya River, 24 km west of Arkhangelsk (the district's administrative centre) by road. Tsiglomen is the nearest rural locality.

References 

Rural localities in Primorsky District, Arkhangelsk Oblast